Veddum is a village in Mariagerfjord Municipality, in the North Jutland Region of Denmark.

References 

Mariagerfjord Municipality